Municipal elections were held in Hajdúsámson, Hajdú-Bihar County in Hungary in 2010.

Results

Mayor

Council
The elected members were:
Péterné Ács
Zoltán Bacskai 
Róbert Farkas 
Csaba Fekete 
István Zoltán Fekete 
Jánosné Józan 
Zoltán Sándor Kerekes 
Ferenc Papp 
Gábor Sólyom 
József Cseke 
István Hermann
János Magyar Pistai
Zoltán Tar

2010 in Hungary
2010 elections in Europe
Local elections in Hungary
Municipal election, 2010